The 1885–86 Scottish Districts season is a record of all the  rugby union matches for Scotland's district teams.

It includes the East of Scotland District versus West of Scotland District trial match.

History

The Hamilton Crescent ground was being re-turfed, so the Inter-City was played at Hampden Park for the first time that any rugby match was played there. The match was played in splendid weather. The Leeds Mercury reported that the match was the finest rugby match ever played in Glasgow; and that the attendance was the largest ever for a rugby match in Glasgow.

Results

Inter-City

Glasgow District: F. McIndoe (Glasgow Acdemicals), A. E. Stephen (West of Scotland), M. F. Reid (West of Scotland), R. G. Eaglesham (West of Scotland), C. E. Orr (West of Scotland), C. F. P. Fraser (Glasgow University), G. Ker (Glasgow Acdemicals), W. A. Walls (Glasgow Acdemicals), J. French (Glasgow Acdemicals), J. G. Mitchell (West of Scotland), D. Morton (West of Scotland), C. J. B. Milne (West of Scotland), J. E. Orr (West of Scotland), W. A. Macdonald (1st Lanarkshire Rifle Volunteers), D. McLeod (West of Scotland).

Edinburgh District: Cameron (Watsonians), G. Maitland (Edinburgh Institution F.P.), R. H. Morrison (Edinburgh University), Evans (Edinburgh Institution F.P.), A. G. G. Asher (Edinburgh Wanderers), A. R. Don-Wauchope (Edinburgh Wanderers), C. Reid, W. Huskie, T. Ainslie (Edinburgh Institution F.P.), J. McLeod (Edinburgh Institution F.P.), G. Henderson (Edinburgh Institution F.P.), J. Horsburgh Duke (Royal HSFP), J. Tod (Watsonians)

Other Scottish matches

North of Scotland District: Back, C. Low (Dundee High School); halt-backs, A. Stewart (St Andrews University), A. Wills (High School), and H. P. Stiven (Panmure); quarter-backs, J. C. Baird and R. Lawson (St Antirews); forwards, M. McKerracher, J. Hill, and T. Bell (St Andrews), T. C. Ferguson (captain), P. G. Grant, and E. Carmichael (High School), C. M. Stewart and F. Hay (Panmure), P. Stewart (Kirkcaldy).

Glasgow District: Back, F. Macindoe (Glasgow Academicals) ; half-backs, A. E. Stephen (West of Scotland), C. J. Higginbotham, and W. Robertson (Glasgow University) ; quarterbacks, C. E. Orr (West o£ Scotland) and C. F. P. Fraser (University); forwards, A. W. Young, J. B. Brown (captain), and J. French (Academicals), J. G. Mitchell, D. Morton, J. E. Orr, W. Neilson, and D. G. Findlay (West), and H. Edmiston (Clydesdale). 

East: J. P. Veitch (Royal HSFP), R. H. Morrison (Edinburgh University), G. Wilson (Royal HSFP), R. D. Sewell (Fettesian- Loretonians), P. H. Don-Wauchope (Fettesian- Loretonians), A. R. Don-Wauchope (Fettesian- Loretonians), A. G. G. Asher (Fettesian- Loretonians), C. Reid (Edinburgh Academicals), T. W. Irvine (Edinburgh Academicals), J. Rankin (Watsonians), T. Ainslie (Edinburgh Institution F.P.) [captain], A. P. Clay (Edinburgh Academicals), M. McLeod (Edinburgh Wanderers), M. C. M‘Ewan (Edinburgh Academicals), A. Duke (Royal HSFP), G. Henderson (Edinburgh Institution F.P.). 

West: F. McIndoe (Glasgow Academicals), A. E. Stephen (West of Scotland), M. F. Reid (West of Scotland), W. Robertson (Glasgow University), C. F. Fraser (Glasgow University), H. Nelson (West of Scotland); J. B. Brown (Glasgow Academicals) [captain], J. French (Glasgow Academicals), W. A. Walls (Glasgow Academicals), H. T. Ker (Glasgow Academicals), C. J. B. Milne (West of Scotland), J. G. Mitchell (West of Scotland), G. Findlay (West of Scotland), D. A. Macleod (Glasgow University), W. A. Macdonald (1st Lanarkshire Rifle Volunteers).

English matches

No other District matches played.

International matches

No touring matches this season.

References

1885–86 in Scottish rugby union
Scottish Districts seasons